Sanjari  is a village in Malkharoda tehsil, Janjgir–Champa district, Chhattisgarh, India.

In the fiscal year 2000-2001 fifteen wells were dug or drilled in Sanjari village, and nine of them were hooked up to a water system for irrigation.

References

Villages in Janjgir-Champa district